Red Indians is a 2001 Malayalam action-drama movie directed by Sunil and produced by Ahmed Bachan. It stars Vijayaraghavan, Vikram and Preetha Vijayakumar.

Plot
A forest smuggle named Wayanadan, lives in the jungle and smuggles sandalwood. He is also involved with other anti-social behaviour and forest controlling activities like robberies, dacoity, murders and drug pedalling. He consequently kidnaps an electrician Rahul and takes him to the jungle, forcing him to teach him how to make explosives. Rahul refuses to help create bombs and is subsequently falsely accused of murder. The rest of the story is about how Rahul proves his innocence to police investigators.

Cast
Vijayaraghavan as ACP Ravisankar IPS
Preetha Vijayakumar as Preetha
Vikram as Rahul
Mohanraj as Hyder Marakkyar
Charanraj as Jacky/Jackson
Vimalraj as Kazhuku Maruthu
Baburaj as Jumbo Sankar
Abu Salim as Pokken
Mansoor Ali Khan as Wayanadan
Captain Raju as Commissioner
Manjula Vijayakumar as Matha Mayadevi
Devan as CI Harisankar
Suvarna Mathew as Maya Harisankar
Prathapachandran as Dr Madhavadas
Alphonsa as Item dancer

Release
The film was originally released in Malayalam in May 2001; later it was dubbed and re-released in Tamil as Thilak in June 2004. It was also dubbed and released in Telugu under the same name.

References

2000s Malayalam-language films